The Tragedy of Brutus; or, The Fall of Tarquin is a tragic play by John Howard Payne. It depicts the events of the fall of the Roman monarchy. The title characters are Lucius Junius Brutus and the Roman king Tarquin the Proud.

References

Cultural depictions of Lucius Junius Brutus
Cultural depictions of Sextus Tarquinius
Cultural depictions of Lucius Tarquinius Superbus
Tragedy plays
Plays set in the 6th century BC